The cuneiform sign am, is a common-use sign of the Amarna letters, the Epic of Gilgamesh, and other cuneiform texts (for example Hittite texts). It is also used as AM.

Linguistically, it has the alphabetical usage in texts for a, or m, or syllabically for am. The "a" is replaceable in word formation by any of the 4 vowels: a, e, i, or u.

Epic of Gilgamesh usage
The am sign usage in the Epic of Gilgamesh is as follows: am-(87 times); AM-(4).

References

Moran, William L. 1987, 1992. The Amarna Letters. Johns Hopkins University Press, 1987, 1992. 393 pages.(softcover)
 Parpola, 1971. The Standard Babylonian Epic of Gilgamesh, Parpola, Simo, Neo-Assyrian Text Corpus Project, c 1997, Tablet I thru Tablet XII, Index of Names, Sign List, and Glossary-(pp. 119–145), 165 pages.

Cuneiform signs